Joungho Kim is an electrical engineer with the Korea Advanced Institute of Science and Technology (KAIST) in Daejeon, South Korea. 
Kim was named a Fellow of the Institute of Electrical and Electronics Engineers (IEEE) in 2016 for his contributions to modeling signal and power integrity in 3D integrated circuits.

References 

Fellow Members of the IEEE
Living people
South Korean engineers
Year of birth missing (living people)